The Greatest Fits is the 2001 greatest hits album by Canadian rock band, Headstones. The compilation features two new tracks, "Blowtorch" and "Come On". "Come On" was used as the theme for the Canadian sketch show Comedy Inc..

Track listing

References

2001 greatest hits albums
Headstones (band) albums
Universal Records compilation albums